Bob de Moor is the pen name of Robert Frans Marie De Moor (20 December 1925 – 26 August 1992), a Belgian comics creator. Chiefly noted as an artist, he is considered an early master of the Ligne claire style. He wrote and drew several comics series on his own, but also collaborated with Hergé on several volumes of The Adventures of Tintin. He completed the unfinished story Professor Sató's Three Formulae, Volume 2: Mortimer vs. Mortimer of the Blake and Mortimer series, after the death of the author Edgar P. Jacobs.

Biography
Bob de Moor started drawing with pencil at three or four. Living in a port town, he developed a strong interest for drawing sailing ships which carried into his professional career with his Cori, de Scheepsjongen series and other work. Following studies at the Antwerp Academy of Fine Arts, De Moor started his career at the Afim animations studios. His first album was written in 1944 for "De Kleine Zondagsvriend".

Beginning in March 1951, starting with Destination Moon, he began a collaboration with Hergé on Tintin albums and Tintin-related material which included extensive work on sketch studies, backgrounds, layout, and ultimately animated films.

His co-worker Jacques Martin is quoted as saying that de Moor had an extraordinary facility to adapt himself to the style of others. This manifested in a seamless integration with Hergé's style, as well as in him being asked on occasion to complete the work of other artists.

De Moor illustrated the album cover of "A World of Machines" (1982) by the Belgian band The Machines.

His son Johan de Moor is also a cartoonist, and completed his father's last album, the fifth in the Cori le Moussaillon series after his father's demise.

Bob de Moor and Tintin
Bob de Moor worked at Studio Hergé from April 1951 to the end of 1986. For Hergé, he was the perfect assistant because he was one of the few who could draw his figures just as or even better than himself. Among the most important works of de Moor on Tintin and Milou are:

·The complete redrawing and revision of the 7th Tintin-Adventure "The Black Island" (1965), for which de Moor was sent by Hergé to England and Scotland in 1962 to find or search for original locations. The cover is also drawn by Bob de Moor.

· While Hergé was on a trip in the summer of 1965, a reporter for the Swiss magazine L’illustré asked De Moor and Jacques Martin if any progress had been made on a new Tintin adventure. Without Hergé's knowledge, the pair created a fake page that they managed to pass off as a genuine extract from an unfinished Tintin book. The page was printed in the magazine, and Hergé - while initially upset - later relented and purchased the work.

·Tintin and the Lake of Sharks (1972). Bob de Moor drew and colorized the 47-page film album based on a scenario by Michel Greg.

· One of de Moor's most important works was the drawings for the 1976 album "Tintin and the Picaros". Although Hergé denied that the complete album was drawn at the drawing table by Bob de Moor, most of the drawings probably came from de Moor's hand.

Bibliography

 1949 Le Vaisseau Miracle
 1949 Guerre dans le Cosmos, Ed. Coune
 1950 Le Lion de Flandre, Ed. Deligne
 1950 L'Enigmatic Monsieur Barelli, Ed. du Lombard
 1950 Monsieur Tric, Ed. Bédéscope
 1951 Les Gars des Flandres, Ed. Bédéscope
 1951 Conrad le Hardi, Ed. Bédéscope
 1952 Barelli à Nusa-Penida
 1959 Les Pirates d'eau douce
 1964 Balthazar
 1966 Barelli et les agents secrets, Ed. du Lombard
 1971 Le Repaire du loup, Ed. Casterman
 1972 Barelli et le Bouddha boudant, Ed. du Lombard
 1973 Bonne Mine à la mer (Barelli), Ed. du Lombard
 1974 Barelli et le seigneur de Gonobutz
 1978 Cori le Moussaillon: Les Espions de la Reine, Ed. Casterman

Sources

Footnotes

 Bob de Moor publications in Belgian Tintin and French Tintin BDoubliées 
 Bob de Moor index of Tintin and Kuifje covers LeJournalDeTintin.free 
 bdparadisio.com 
 De Moor bio, BD Gest' Bedetheque

External links

 Bob de Moor biography on Lambiek Comiclopedia

1925 births
1992 deaths
Artists from Antwerp
Belgian comics artists
Belgian comics writers
Belgian cartoonists
Belgian caricaturists
Belgian humorists
Belgian illustrators
Album-cover and concert-poster artists
Tintin
Royal Academy of Fine Arts (Antwerp) alumni